Thomas Bere or Bera (fl. 1391–1397) of Bodmin, Cornwall, was an English politician.

He was a Member (MP) of the Parliament of England for Bodmin in 1391, 1395 and January 1397.

References

Year of birth missing
Year of death missing
English MPs 1391
English MPs 1395
English MPs January 1397
Members of the Parliament of England for Bodmin